Zhelezniakov is a river warship of the Soviet Navy, monitor of project SB-37. It took part in World War II. The warship became a lead ship in its class of six ships that were built before the war and the only one that survived World War II.

The ship was named after the Russian sailor Anatoli Zhelezniakov who was famous for being among those who dispersed the Russian Constituent Assembly in 1918 and his saying "The guard has grown weary".

In 1967 it was installed in the Sailor's Park at Rybalskyi island as a monument-memorial. The same year around the monument was created the Sailor's Park (official name "To the sailor's of the Dnieper Flotilla"). The ship is a landmark of science and technology, history with a protected number 260062-N.

1935 ships
Zhelezniakov-class monitors
Ships built at Kuznya na Rybalskomu
World War II naval ships of the Soviet Union
Rybalskyi Island
Ships built in the Soviet Union
National Landmarks in Kyiv